Rolan Alfonso Bell (born 17 October 1983) is a British actor who was born in Chiswick, West London, of Jamaican origin. He became known for appearing in the BBC One television soap opera EastEnders as Theo Kelly in 2009, and the role of Sgt King (Kingy) in the BBC drama Our Girl.

Background and career
Bell was born in London, England, to Jamaican parents (the second oldest of their seven children). He began his training as an actor in 2000 at Hammersmith and West London College on a two-year performing arts course, before going on to the Drama Centre London. Bell was first seen professionally in Doctors in 2006 and also appeared in a number of theatre productions, including a stage adaptation of The Harder They Come in which he played the lead role, in Margaret Busby's An African Cargo (2007) and The Lion King. Bell also played the role of Fela Kuti in the Broadway show Fela! in December 2010.

In 2012, Bell appeared as Coalhouse Walker Jr in Ragtime, the Musical.

He played Silly Billy in the pantomime Jack and The Beanstalk at the Cambridge Arts Theatre from 6 December 2012 to 13 January 2013 (Hugh Homan commented in The Stage: "Rolan Bell as Silly Billy is superb at involving the audience"). He played the role of Britney in the We Will Rock You world arena tour 2013. Also in 2013 Bell appeared in the BBC drama series WPCV 56.

For his performance in the West End production of Memphis The Musical, he was nominated for an Olivier Award for Best Actor in a Supporting Role in a Musical in 2015.

He was announced in October 2015 as leading the cast for Rapunzel, the Park Theatre's Christmas show.

References

External links

British male television actors
Black British male actors
Living people
1983 births
English people of Jamaican descent
People from Chiswick
Alumni of the Drama Centre London
British male stage actors
British male musical theatre actors